Crash Commando is a downloadable game for the PlayStation 3. It was released on December 18, 2008.

Gameplay

Crash Commando, is a side-scrolling multiplayer shooter game pitting two commando factions, the Grunts and the Jarheads, against each other. Crash Commando is a fast-paced, comedic game with over-the-top, slapstick action that features exaggerated gore and effects.

The player controls a commando with a range of weapons and other equipment at his disposal, including a jetpack, a rocket launcher, C4, jeeps, and tanks. Each map consists of two gameplay layers the player can move between via portals in the environment.

An update to the game included a new playable game mode: Heist. A bag of money is spawned onto the map and the two teams are tasked with grabbing the money and bringing it to their own safe, located at home base. Along with the game mode, the pack also comes with two new maps. The update also includes new playable characters.

PlayStation Home
Crash Commando was one of the few games that could be fully game launched in PlayStation Home. Game launching let users set up a game in Home and launch directly into the game from Home. When users quit the game, they were returned directly to Home.

Reception

Crash Commando received favourable reviews from critics, especially for the multiplayer aspect of the game.

References

External links
Official Sony page
EPOS Game Studios Website

2008 video games
PlayStation 3 games
PlayStation 3-only games
PlayStation Network games
Sony Interactive Entertainment games
Video games developed in Sweden
Video games scored by Olof Gustafsson
Multiplayer and single-player video games
Run and gun games